"Don't Cry" is a song by Human Nature, released in June 1999 as the third single from their album second studio album Counting Down (1999). The song peaked at No. 5 in Australia and was certified Gold.

Track listing
CD single (666535.2)
 "Don't Cry" (US Radio Remix) - 4:01
 "What If I Said" - 3:49
 "Last To Know" (Brothers Radio Remix) - 4:03
 "Last To Know" (Discothèque Club Remix) - 6:43
 "Don't Cry" (DIY Mix) - 4:27

Charts

Weekly charts

Year-end charts

Sales and certifications

External links
8

References

1999 singles
Human Nature (band) songs
1998 songs
Sony Music Australia singles
Songs written by Andrew Klippel
Black-and-white music videos